Border Gateway Protocol Security (BGPsec) is a security extension of the Border Gateway Protocol defined in RFC 8205, published in September 2017. BGPsec provides to receivers of valid BGPsec UPDATE messages cryptographic verification of the routes they advertise. BGPsec replaces the BGP AS_PATH attribute with a new BGPsec_Path attribute.

BGPsec RFCs 

  - BGPsec Protocol Specification
  - BGPsec Considerations for Autonomous System (AS) Migration
  - BGPsec Operational Considerations
  - BGPsec Algorithms, Key Formats, and Signature Formats
  - A Profile for BGPsec Router Certificates, Certificate Revocation Lists, and Certification Requests

See also 

 Autonomous system (Internet)
 Border Gateway Protocol

References 

Routing protocols
Cryptographic protocols